Phimophis vittatus, also known as the banded pampas snake, is a species of colubrid snake in the subfamily Dipsadinae.
It is endemic to South America.

Distribution and habitat
The species has been recorded from shrubland, savannah and forest habitats in Argentina, Bolivia and Paraguay.

Ecology
The species is terrestrial, burrowing in sandy soils. It has nocturnal habits and preys mainly on lizards.

References

Dipsadinae
Snake genera